Ghana Music Rights Organization (GHAMRO) is a royalties collection agency within Ghana, that represents the rights of music copyright holders. It was created under section 49 of the Copyright Law, Act 690 of 2005. The agency collects royalties for all rights owners in Ghana. Before 2005, that function had been operated by the Copyright Society of Ghana. The organization has faced regular criticism about its transparency and engagement of stakeholders. As of 2018, the organization was led by Rex Omar. Abraham Adjatey, commonly known as 'Agya Abraham' is currently the CEO of the organization.

References 

Music licensing organizations
Music organisations based in Ghana
Organizations established in 2005